219 Days is the debut album of Canadian Idol winner Kalan Porter.  The album was released on November 23, 2004 through Sony Music Canada. The album title refers to the number of days from his first audition to the release of his debut CD. The album debuted at #4 on the Canadian Albums Chart and was certified double platinum by the CRIA months later with an excess of 200,000 copies.

Track listing

Singles
"Awake in a Dream"
"Single"
"In Spite of It All"

References

External links
kalanporter.com 

Kalan Porter albums
2004 debut albums
Sony Music Canada albums